The third season of The Bachelorette, an ABC reality television series, premiered on January 10, 2005. This season featured 28-year-old Jennifer Schefft, a publicist from Mentor, Ohio.

Schefft was previously the winner of season 3 of The Bachelor, where she got engaged to Andrew Firestone; however, they ended their engagement in December 2003. For her season, Schefft had the opportunity to assist in casting the 25 bachelors from which she will choose.

The season concluded on February 28, 2005, with Schefft choosing to pursue a relationship with 29-year-old art gallery director Jerry Ferris. However, she rejected his proposal, and it was revealed during the live After The Final Rose special that they were no longer together.

Bachelorette
Jennifer Ann Schefft, born July 23, 1976, is a native of Mentor, Ohio.  

In 2007, Schefft wrote A No-Regrets Guide to Loving Yourself and Never Settling - Better Single Than Sorry, published by HarperCollins.  On July 10, 2009, Schefft married Joe Waterman in Chicago.

Contestants

Call-out order

 The contestant received the first impression rose
 The contestant was eliminated at the rose ceremony
 The contestant quit the competition
 The contestant won the competition

Episodes

References

2005 American television seasons
The Bachelorette (American TV series) seasons
Television shows filmed in New York (state)
Television shows filmed in Oklahoma
Television shows filmed in Oregon
Television shows filmed in Illinois
Television shows filmed in Bermuda
Television shows filmed in Georgia (U.S. state)
Television shows filmed in Massachusetts